Migrant crisis is the intense difficulty, trouble, or danger situation in the receiving state (destination country) due to the movements of large groups of immigrants (displaced people, refugee or asylum seeker) escaping from the conditions (natural or artificially created) which negatively affected their situation (security, economic, political or societal) at the country of origin (departure). The "crisis" situation is not the refugee numbers (number of migrants seeking protection) but the system's failure to respond in an orderly way to the government's legal obligations. Some notable crises are; European migrant crisis, English Channel migrant crisis and World War II evacuation and expulsion.

A refugee crisis refers to a movement of "large" groups of displaced people, and may or may not involve a migrant crisis. The US government's legal obligations inadvertently created the 2014 American immigration crisis. The crisis developed because of unaccompanied children who do not have a legal guardian to provide physical custody (USA ratified the Convention on the Rights of the Child), and care quickly overwhelmed the "local border patrols" creating a migrant crisis. Push-Pull view: The "refugee crisis" is a humanitarian one for those adopting the "Push" factors as main cause, while they acknowledge that reasons for migration may be mixed, even the refugees as weapons. For those focusing on "Pull" factors, the "migration crisis" has its roots in border enforcement policies (Immigration system) that were perceived as not sufficiently strict and the need for cheap workers for US business (family separation policy), severe (Operation Streamline), or careful (catch & release) by potential migrants. Compared to refugee crisis (refugee is a refugee), migrant crises also have a separate or distinguish between the “deserving” refugee from the “undeserving” migrant and play into fear of cultural, religious, and ethnic difference in the midst of increasing intense, excessive, and persistent worry and fear about everyday situations and lacking in predictability, job security, material or psychological welfare for many in Europe (such in closure of Green Borders).

"Migrant crisis management" involves dealing with issues ("immigration system", "resource management", etc.) before, during, and after they have occurred. According to Global Crisis Centre, migrant crisis management is shaped using the definitions and responsibilities outlined in the UN's Convention Relating to the Status of Refugees and subsequent Protocol Relating to the Status of Refugees and international solidarity and burden-sharing with collaboration, communication and information dissemination, which are needed for solving migratory issues of the world.

Crisis management 
Immigrant receiving states need effective management strategies at achieving a set of tasks for responding to the threat [reasons of crisis] to re-establish a perceived normalcy.

"Transboundary crisis management" (migration is transboundary) involves co-decision, shared procedures and collective instruments in aligned with the steps below:
Detection: Recognition of threat.  (process: emerging-timely) 
Sense-making: critical information for picture of the situation. (process: the collecting, analysing, sharing)
Decision-making: formulation of an effective strategy (process: formulation of key decisions)
Coordination: collaboration between key partners. 
Meaning-making: Messaging on the path taken (process: explanation, actionable advice, and a sense).
Communication: message delivery (victims, citizens, stakeholders, ...). 
Accountability: Production of documents that list the decisions and strategies.

European migrant crisis 
Management of the crisis shows succession of four scenarios.
 (2011 fall of Gaddafi) Libya let the flow of irregular migrants. EU Commission approve "Communication on Global Approach to Migration and Mobility" (GAMM). 
 (November 2013-October 2014) The Italy's humanitarian Operation Mare Nostrum. 
 (November 2014-September 2015) The EU recognize humanitarian and migratory pressures shelves GAMM and develops another comprehensive approach
 (October 2015) Migrants and refugees: the European Council secure the borders against the unwanted migrants and refugees. (Valletta Summit on Migration)

Role of NGO 
Institution that works in this area is the Migration Policy Institute.  Global Crisis Centre of PricewaterhouseCoopers works on migrant crisis management.

Crisis and immigration system 
Broken immigration system (Crisis) is what immigration experts and lawyers refer to as failure in management of "push and pull factors." Push forces for the displaced people are summarized as running from horrors and poverty in the departure country toward a broken immigration system in the receiving states. Pull forces are receiving states having a functioning economy, the safer-faster journey with the help of communication technology (organize and warn) and established smuggler networks which has safer-faster ways to move people. For a full description Human migration#Lee.  The condition of refugee or asylum seekers in receiving countries, from the perspective of governments, employers, and citizens, is a topic of continual debate (debate on migrant crises), and on the other end, the violation of migrant human rights is an ongoing crisis.

Immigration reform 

According to Salil Shetty, Secretary General of Amnesty International,

Crisis and resource management 
Broken resource management toward the immigrants is part of the inability to develop efficient responses to people in need, causing crisis. The asylum offices in USA, United Kingdom and Australia manages the immigration services.

United States 
During 2014 American immigration crisis, immigration courts as well as the U.S. Citizenship and Immigration Services (USCIS) asylum system are completely under-resourced and confronting an unmanageable caseload. In June, 2019 (five years into crisis), more than 350 "unaccompanied children" have been removed from a holding facility in Texas to bring it into compliance as designed to hold around 120.

Resource management towards the immigrants in USA includes "private sector" involvement as listed in the Immigration Reform and Control Act of 1986. Law mandates that all companies must help the federal government. Specific immigration areas where human resource managers must ensure compliance by meeting the legal requirements of this immigration reform regulation by incorporating the Immigration and Naturalization Services (INS) Form I-9 into their hiring processes.

Another case for resource management for migrant crisis is the Trump wall, which is a colloquial name for President Trump's solution to immigration. President Trump signed Executive Order 13767, which formally directed the US government to begin attempting wall construction. Executive Order 13767 followed with the 2018 federal government shutdown because of presidential veto on any spending bill that did not include "resource" on wall funding. In February 2019, Trump signed a Declaration of National Emergency, saying situation is a "crisis," officially declaring a "Migrant Crisis" in the Mexico–United States border.

EU 
The financial burden of crises: Germany allocated roughly 10 billion Euros for the cost of refugee care and acceptance in 2015. On the other hand, Greece was exempt to pay from EU-wide refugee sharing initiatives between 2013 and 2015. The migrant crisis is thought to have influenced policies in countries seeking accession to the EU, such as Serbia.

United Kingdom 
Resource management toward the immigrants in UK managed under National Asylum Support Service (NASS) which is tasked with the responsibility for regulating entry to, and settlement in the interests of sustainable growth and social inclusion. NASS is a section of the UK Visas and Immigration (UKVI) division of the Home Office which support "otherwise be destitute." Provision of accommodation is part of the process.

List of migrant crises 
 2014 American immigration crisis
2020 Greek–Turkish border crisis
2021 Belarus–European Union border crisis
 European migrant crisis
 English Channel migrant crisis
 Turkey's migrant crisis
 World War II evacuation and expulsion (For the 1940s migration and refugees developments)

References 

Migrant crises